Checkpoint protein HUS1 is a protein that in humans is encoded by the HUS1 gene.

Function 

The protein encoded by this gene is a component of an evolutionarily conserved, genotoxin-activated checkpoint complex that is involved in the cell cycle arrest in response to DNA damage. This protein forms a heterotrimeric complex with checkpoint proteins RAD9 and RAD1. In response to DNA damage, the trimeric complex interacts with another protein complex consisting of checkpoint protein RAD17 and four small subunits of the replication factor C (RFC), which loads the combined complex onto the chromatin. The DNA damage induced chromatin binding has been shown to depend on the activation of the checkpoint kinase ATM, and is thought to be an early checkpoint signaling event.

Interactions 

HUS1 has been shown to interact with:

 HDAC1, 
 PCNA,
 RAD1 homolog 
 RAD17,  and
 RAD9A.

References

Further reading